Saints Leo and Paregorius (died ) were two early Christian martyrs at Patara (Lycia) in Anatolia.
Their feast day is 18 February.

Monks of Ramsgate account

The monks of St Augustine's Abbey, Ramsgate wrote in their Book of Saints (1921),

Butler's account

The hagiographer Alban Butler (1710–1773) wrote in his Lives of the Fathers, Martyrs, and Other Principal Saints,

Notes

Sources

 

Saints from Roman Anatolia
260 deaths